Doocrock is a townland in County Tyrone, Northern Ireland. It is situated in the historic barony of Omagh East and the civil parish of Dromore and covers an area of 426 acres.

The name derives from the Irish: Dubh Chnoc (a Black Hill).

The population of the townland declined during the 19th century:

The townland contains one Scheduled Historic Monument: a court tomb (grid ref:  H2764 6219).

See also
List of townlands of County Tyrone
List of archaeological sites in County Tyrone

References

Townlands of County Tyrone
Archaeological sites in County Tyrone
Barony of Omagh East